Events from the year 1793 in art.

Events
 August 10 – The Louvre in Paris opens to the public as an art museum, with 537 paintings.
 Henry Fuseli begins to paints scenes from Paradise Lost.
 Aleksander Orłowski joins the Polish army; this leads to his participation in the Kościuszko Uprising.

Works

 William Beechey – Portrait of Sir Francis Ford’s Children Giving a Coin to a Beggar Boy
 William Blake – For Children: The Gates of Paradise (engravings)
 Antonio Canova – Psyche Revived by Cupid's Kiss (marble statue, 1st version, commissioned 1787, enters Louvre 1824)
 Jacques-Louis David – The Death of Marat
 Francisco Goya – Attack on a Coach
 Philip James de Loutherbourg – The Siege of Valenciennes
 John Opie – Boadicea Haranguing the Britons
 François Marie Suzanne – terra cotta figure of Benjamin Franklin
 Utamaro – Three Beauties of the Present Day (nishiki-e color woodblock print; approximate date)

Births
 January 15 – Ferdinand Georg Waldmüller, Austrian painter and writer (died 1865)
 February 13 – Philipp Veit, German Romantic painter (died 1887)
 June 1 – Augustus Earle, English artist (died 1838)
 June 3 – Edmund Thomas Parris, English history, portrait, subject, and panorama painter, book illustrator, designer and art restorer (died 1873)
 July 19 – Thomas Doughty, American landscape painter  (died 1856)
 August 3 – Jacques-Jean Barre, French engraver and designer of French medals, the Great Seal of France, bank notes and postage stamps (died 1855)
 October 11 – Johan Erik Lindh, Swedish painter and former decorative painter who moved to Finland (died 1865)
 November 3 – Thomas Ender, Austrian painter (died 1875)
 November 5 – Antoine Maurin, French lithographer (died 1860)
 November 16 – Francis Danby, Irish landscape painter from the south of Ireland (died 1861)
 November 17 – Charles Lock Eastlake, English painter and art collector (died 1865)
 November 25 – Robert Havell, Jr., English principal engraver of Audubon's The Birds of America (died 1878)
 December 3 – Clarkson Frederick Stanfield, English marine painter (died 1867)
 December 7 – Joseph Severn, English portrait and subject painter (died 1879)
 date unknown
 Henry Perronet Briggs, English portrait and historical painter (died 1844)
 Margaret Sarah Carpenter, née Geddes, English portrait painter (died 1872)
 Erin Corr, Irish engraver (died 1862)
 Angelus de Baets, Belgian painter of portraits and architectural subjects (died 1855)
 Luo Bingzhang, Han Chinese official, military general, calligrapher and devout Confucian scholar (died 1867)
 Jacobus Josephus Eeckhout, Belgian historical and genre subject painter (died 1861)
 Jean-Antoine-Siméon Fort, French artist painting in oil and watercolours (died 1861)
 Václav Mánes, Czech painter (died 1858)
 Angélique Mezzara, French portrait painter and miniaturist (died 1868)
 Boris Orlovsky, Russian sculptor (died 1837)
 Louis Royer, Austrian Netherlands sculptor (died 1868)
 Watanabe Kazan, Japanese painter, scholar and statesman (died 1841)

Deaths
 January 1 – Francesco Guardi, Venetian painter of veduta (born 1712)
 March 2 – Carl Gustaf Pilo, Swedish-born painter (born 1711)
 May 15 - Peter Adolf Hall, Swedish-French artist who mainly devoted himself to miniature painting (born 1739)
 May 29 – John Webber, English landscape artist (born 1751)
 July 5
 Alexander Roslin, Swedish portrait painter  (born 1718)
 Peter Anton von Verschaffelt, Flemish sculptor and architect (born 1710)
 September 9 – Peter Perez Burdett, English draughtsman (born c.1734)
 October 5 – José del Castillo, Spanish painter and a leader of the artistic movement Illustrious Absolutism (born 1737)
 November – Dominic Serres, French-born painter of naval maritime scenes (born 1719)
 November 7 – Per Krafft the Elder, Swedish portrait painter (born 1724)
 November 20 – Teodor Ilić Češljar, Serbian painter of the late Baroque and Rococo period of Vojvodina (born 1746)
 December 13 – Michel-Bruno Bellengé, French painter (born 1726)
 date unknown
 Ramón Bayeu, Spanish Neoclassicist painter (born 1746)
 Maria Carowsky, Swedish artist (born 1723)
 Ignazio Collino, Italian sculptor (born 1724)
 Hendrik de Meijer, Dutch painter (born 1744)
 Mauritius Lowe, British painter and engraver (born 1746)
 Giuseppe Sanmartino, Italian sculptor during the Rococo period (born 1720)
 Dominic Serres "the Elder", French-born marine painter (born 1722)
 Antonio González Velázquez, Spanish late-Baroque painter (born 1723)

References

 
Years of the 18th century in art
1790s in art